Katzir may refer to:

Places
Katzir, a Jewish locality in northern Israel
Katzir-Harish, an earlier town (local council) in the Haifa District of Israel. However, in 2012 the two were separated, with Harish remaining a local council and Katzir reverting to the jurisdiction of Menashe Regional Council
Tel Katzir, a kibbutz in northern Israel

Persons
Katzir (surname), persons with the surname

Others
Katchalski-Katzir algorithm, algorithm for docking of rigid molecules, developed by Ephraim Katchalski/Katzir